Sir Pitti Theagaraya Chetty KCSI (27 April 1852 – 28 April 1925) was an Indian lawyer, industrialist and a prominent political leader from the erstwhile Madras province. He was one of the founders of the Justice Party in 1916 along with C. Natesa Mudaliar, Dr. T. M. Nair. T.Nagar is a locality in Chennai which is named after him. On 1919 January 1, the title Dewan Bahadur was awarded to him 

Theagaraya Chetty was born in Madras Presidency. After graduating from Presidency College, Madras he served as a corporator and legislator. He had an avid interest in politics and served as a member of the Indian National Congress before founding the South Indian Liberal Federation in 1917. He served as the president of the federation from 1917 till his death in 1925.

Early life

Chetty was born to a Telugu Devanga family in Egathur, Madras Presidency on 27 April 1852. He did his schooling in Chennai and graduated in law from Presidency College, Madras. On graduation, he entered public life and served as a member of the Corporation of Madras from 1882 to 1922. He also served terms as the president of the Corporation of Madras, and then as a Councillor till 1922. He was the first non-official President of the Madras Corporation.

He was one of the founder-members of the South Indian Chamber of Commerce and served as its president. from 1910 to 1921. When the Industrial Conference came to Madras, Theagaraya Chetty was the chairman of the Reception Committee. Theagaraya Chetty fought on behalf of the Indian Patriot newspaper and its editor Karunakara Menon against Dr T. M. Nair who later became his close associate.

The Dravidian Movement

The Madras Non-Brahmin Association was formed in 1909 by two lawyers from Madras city, P. Subramanyam and M. Purushotham Naidu. Sir Theagaroya Chetty did not involve himself in the movement until 1912, when the Madras United League (Later renamed as Madras Dravidian Association) was formed.

At a meeting held in Madras in November 1916 by a group of about thirty people, including Theagaraya Chetti and Dr. T. M. Nair, it was resolved to start a company for publishing newspapers advocating the cause of the non-Brahmin community. The newspaper was named Justice and started publishing from 26 February 1917 onwards. Dr. T. M. Nair was its first Editor.

The South Indian People's Association was later formed as the mouthpiece of non-Brahmins with organizing the media arm of the non-Brahmin Movement as its main objective. A political party was organised by the South Indian People's Association under the leadership of Sir P.Theagaroya Chetty and Dr. T. M. Nair and was named the South Indian Liberal Federation. It later came to be popularly known as the Justice Party after the English daily Justice which the party published. The Federation was organised in October 1917 and its objectives were defined as :

Early Years of the Justice Party

Theagaraya Chetty was elected the first president of the Justice Party and served as president until his death in 1925. A constitution was drawn on 17 October 1917. District and city boards were established all over the Presidency.

In the initial stages, the Justice Party concentrated its energies on work of a social character than political.  During this period, the Justice Party held all-India non-Brahmin conferences to unite non-Brahmins all over the country. The Justice Party argued for separate electorates and reservations in government jobs and civil service for non-Brahmins, at the British Parliament in London. In 1919, Dr. T. M. Nair, the President of the Justice Party and leader of the delegation died in London at the age of fifty-one and was succeeded as President by Theagaraya Chetty.

1920 elections

When elections were held in December 1920 in the Madras Presidency as per the Montagu–Chelmsford Reforms, the Justice Party obtained a comfortable majority by winning 63 seats out of 98. The Governor of Madras invited Theagaraya Chetty to form the Government. However, Theagaraya Chetty refused on account of the ethical rule that head of a political party can't hold a post in the cabinet too. As a result, A. Subbarayalu Reddiar was appointed Chief Minister. He served for a few months before being succeeded by the Raja of Panagal.

Attitude towards Brahmins

In his speech as the president of the Reception Committee of the First Non-Brahmin Confederation, Theagaraya Chetty spoke:

Death and legacy
Theagaraya Chetty died on 28 April 1925 and was succeeded by the Raja of Panagal as the president of the Justice Party. He is usually credited for the victories of the Justice Party in the 1920 and 1923 elections and for turning the Justice Party into a formidable force in the Presidency that continued to be so for a couple of decades.

The locality T Nagar in Chennai is named after him. It is an important commercial centre today.

Notes

See also
 List of presidents of the Justice Party

References

 
 , Pg 38 - 42

External links
Obituary published in Periyar E. V. Ramasamy's Kudi Arasu

1852 births
1925 deaths
Knights Commander of the Order of the Star of India
Indian knights
Tamil Nadu politicians
Presidency College, Chennai alumni
Justice Party (India) politicians
Telugu people